The German model Kati Nescher (born 12 December 1984) was born in Russia.

Career
Nescher was discovered at the age of 26 while living in Munich by Ann-Kathrin from AM Model Management in Dormagen. She debutted in the summer of 2011 and walked in the following S/S 2012 season. She walked 63 shows worldwide and broke the record by opening more than 12 of them in her first season. She has worked with brands including Chanel, Yves Saint Laurent, Dior, Givenchy and Jimmy Choo.

In 2013 she was ranked No. 20 in models.com's Top 50 Models.

Nescher is now signed with AM Model Management in Dormagen, DNA Model Management in New York City, Why Not Model Agency in Milan, and VIVA Model Management in London and Paris.

Personal life
Nescher gave birth to a son in 2010. She moved to Hollywood, Los Angeles in 2014.

References

External links 

1984 births
Living people
German female models
People from Munich
Russian emigrants to Germany